United Nations Security Council Resolution 318, adopted on July 28, 1972, after reaffirming previous resolutions on the topic, the Council approved the recommendations of the committee established in resolution 253.  The Council then condemned all acts violating the provisions of the previous resolutions, called upon all states continuing to have economic and other relations with Southern Rhodesia to stop immediately and demanded that all member states scrupulously carry out their obligations under the previous resolutions. The Resolution then requested the Secretary-General provide all appropriate assistance to the committee established in resolution 253.

The resolution passed with 14 votes to none, with one abstention from the United States.

See also
 List of United Nations Security Council Resolutions 301 to 400 (1971–1976)
 Unilateral Declaration of Independence (Rhodesia)
 United Nations Security Council Resolution 314

References 
Text of the Resolution at undocs.org

External links
 

 0318
 0318
United Nations Security Council sanctions regimes
July 1972 events